Fredrikstad Fotballklubb (also known as Fredrikstad or FFK) is a Norwegian football club from the town of Fredrikstad. With nine league championships and eleven Norwegian Cup wins, FFK is one of the most successful clubs in Norwegian football. The club was founded in 1903.

After suffering relegation from the then 1st division in 1984, Fredrikstad spent 18 years outside the top flight, before returning to the top division in 2003 after two successive promotions.

Fredrikstad stadion was FFK's home ground between 1914 and 2006. However, its facilities were outdated and the club moved to a new stadium on the other side of river Glomma. Their new ground is located in a former shipyard, incorporating parts of the old buildings in the two sidestands.
FFK draw great support from their area and the official supporter club's name is Plankehaugen. More than 100 coaches filled with fans followed FFK to the cup final of 2006. The club's supporters includes an Ultras section, Supras Fredrikstad. The club had for some years a casuals mob, Brigade Rød-Hvit (Brigade Red - White) which was active in the hooligan scene in Norway.

History 

Fredrikstad Fotballklubb was founded on 7 April 1903. While football in many older clubs was an addition to other established forms of sport, such as skiing or athletics, FFK was the first club in Norway to focus uniquely on playing football, and as such may be labelled the first true football club in the country. A lack of opposition meant this was in fact the third attempt at establishing a football club in Fredrikstad (tradition has it that the second attempt died out when the only football landed on a freight train bound for Moss). Finding someone in the vicinity to play against was still a problem when FFK was founded.

It so happened that the Englishman H. W. Kenworthy, who lived in the neighboring town of Sarpsborg, wanted to practise his native country's sport and travelled to Fredrikstad to take part in one of FFK's training sessions. Upon his return to Sarpsborg it was suggested that he arrange for a new club to be established. The idea was well received in Sarpsborg, and Sarpsborg F.C. was founded on 8 May 1903. The first match between the teams was played the following year in Sarpsborg in front of 600 spectators. FFK won the historical match 4–0. Sarpsborg and Fredrikstad went on to establish the first regional series, and inspired the founding of many new clubs in the region in the years to come.

FFK didn't have the red and white colours when the club was founded in 1903. In fact, they changed suits seven times from 1903 to 1927, when they finally found the one they are using now.

FFK reached the Norwegian Cup final for the first time in 1932. The semifinal against Mjøndalen was played at home in front of a record 9,000 spectators, and FFK won the match 3–0. Fredrikstad met Ørn Horten in the final, winning 6–1, and were thus Norwegian Champions. This signalled the start of Fredrikstad's first successful era, in which the club claimed four more cup titles before the start of World War II. FFK became the first club to win the new nationwide league, in 1937–38, and they won The Double the following season.

In the 1930s, the club also had an active bandy department.

During the German occupation no organised football took place, as a result of all athletes going on strike in support of the resistance. After the war football was more popular than ever, and Fredrikstad set another attendance record against Sarpsborg in the semifinal of the 1945 Norwegian Cup. There was, however, little success on the pitch. FFK reached three cup finals in four years, but lost all of them. The break came in 1949, when FFK won their third league title.

The 1950s and 1960s were highly successful years for FFK. The club secured the league title six times – back to back in 1950–51 and 1951–52 – and finished in second place seven times. The Norwegian Cup was won four times. In 1957, a new milestone was achieved when FFK won their second double. As league champions in 1960, Fredrikstad entered the European Cup as the first team from Norway, sensationally defeating Ajax 4–3 at home and drawing 0–0 in Amsterdam, in the first round.

The town of Fredrikstad was in many ways an economic powerhouse in Norway in the previous century, first as a major supplier of machinery to the timber industry and then as a center of shipbuilding activities. At one point the shipyard in Fredrikstad was the largest in Scandinavia. It has been said that there was always an air of optimism surrounding the town and its inhabitants, and it was certainly reflected in FFK's playful and relaxed style of football, by many regarded as the most entertaining in the country. The club's first cup triumph in '32 even made Jørgen Juve, a legend in Norwegian football, state: "This is how football is supposed to be played."

Perhaps it was because of this relaxed atmosphere that the club was so successful, and also why it eventually fell into decline. After years of glory the club was becoming conservative, although they would not admit it themselves. Other clubs were increasingly turning to professionalism, while players from FFK still played football in addition to having normal jobs. Training regimes were becoming more rigorous than before, but in Fredrikstad they felt that training more than twice a week would ruin the joy of playing football. There is also the sentiment that, in light of the club's formidable history, newer generations of FFK-players were given too much responsibility, folding to the pressure again and again whenever things were starting to look brighter.

Fredrikstad was to struggle throughout the 1970s. They reached the cup final in 1971, but lost to Rosenborg, who were by now firmly en route to becoming a giant in Norwegian football. In 1972, they were runners-up in the league to Viking FK only on goal difference, as both teams finished the season on 34 points. In 1973, for the first time in the club's history, FFK were relegated. They immediately gained promotion via the playoffs and by 1975 were back in the highest division, where they stayed for two seasons before facing relegation yet again.

The elevator ride between divisions continued until 1984. The Norwegian Cup went to Fredrikstad that year, but it must have been a bittersweet success. The club was once again relegated, and this time they were unable to make it back to the top flight. In 1992, FFK were relegated to the third highest division, where they would languish until 2002.

Fredrikstad's comeback from obscurity is largely attributed to manager Knut Torbjørn Eggen, who introduced a degree of professionalism the club had previously lacked. During his tenure, from 2001 until the end of 2006, the son of Rosenborg's successful former coach led the team to their first title in more than two decades. In 2002, they were promoted from the 2. divisjon to the 1. divisjon, and in 2003, their centenary year, Fredrikstad finished second, earning promotion to the top division. Although struggling to maintain their form through an entire season, Fredrikstad have managed to retain their spot three times, and in 2006 they won the Norwegian Cup for the eleventh time in their history. They came 2nd and won silver in the 2008 season, but relegated after a poor season in 2009 to 1. divisjon. They eventually got promoted back to Tippeligaen through playoffs in November 2010 by first beating Løv-Ham 2–0, then Hønefoss BK with a stunning 8–1 goal difference over two matches.

On 13 December 2011 the offices of the club were raided by Norwegian police in connection with the Raio Piiroja contract investigations

Colours and badge 

In the early years of the club, Fredrikstad changed attire quite frequently. The first kit, for example, consisted of blue and white striped shirts and black shorts, but was changed after only two years, to white shirts and blue shorts. In 1910, a green and white kit was adopted ahead of the club's first semifinal in the Norwegian Cup.

The seventh and final iteration of Fredrikstad's kit was introduced after a match between Norway and Poland at Fredrikstad stadion, on 7 October 1926. Fredrikstad wanted to use the colours of the Polish national team and a letter was sent to the Polish Football Association asking for permission to use the Polish colours. Fredrikstad received the following answer:

The Polish association gave their kit to the club and on 17 March 1927, it was officially decided that this should be the colours of Fredrikstad. Since then the kit has changed little in appearance apart from the socks, which went from being red and white to purely white in 1997.

FFK's badge, a streamer with a football and the initials F.F. (the original abbreviation for Fredrikstad Fotballklubb was F.F.), has remained virtually unchanged since its introduction in 1909. The streamer was initially green and white, but once Fredrikstad adopted their current white and red kit, the colours of the streamer changed as well.

Stadium 

The old Fredrikstad stadion was inaugurated in 1914 and was the first stadium in Norway with flood lighting. FFK's record attendance was set in 1956 against Larvik Turn. 15,534 spectators showed up for this quarter final match of the Norwegian Cup. The stadium's last renovation occurred ahead of the 2004 season, putting the capacity at around 10,500.

A new home ground was built for the 2007 season at Fredrikstad Mekaniske Verksted (colloquially known as "Værste"), an old shipyard in the centre of Fredrikstad. This was once the largest shipyard in Scandinavia, and the architecture of the stadium is such that two of the now defunct mechanical workshops, dating from as far back as 1870, are converted into stands at the sides. In addition, two separate stands are built at the ends of the pitch. The new stadium (with the same name, Fredrikstad stadion) have an all-seater capacity of 12,550.

Achievements 

Norwegian top flight:
Winners (9): 1937–38, 1938–39, 1948–49, 1950–51, 1951–52, 1953–54, 1956–57, 1959–60, 1960–61
Runners-up (9): 1949–50, 1954–55, 1955–56, 1958–59, 1964, 1966, 1969, 1972, 2008
Third (1): 1961–62

Norwegian Cup:
Winners (11): 1932, 1935, 1936, 1938, 1940, 1950, 1957, 1961, 1966, 1984, 2006
Runners-up (7): 1945, 1946, 1948, 1954, 1963, 1969, 1971

Recent history 
{|class="wikitable"
|- style="background:#efefef;"
! Season
!
! Pos.
! Pl.
! W
! D
! L
! GS
! GA
! P
!Cup
!Notes
|-
|2003
|1. divisjon
|align=right bgcolor=#DDFFDD| 2
|align=right|30||align=right|19||align=right|5||align=right|6
|align=right|68||align=right|37||align=right|62
||Third round
|Promoted to the Tippeligaen
|-
|2004
|Tippeligaen
|align=right |10
|align=right|26||align=right|9||align=right|5||align=right|12
|align=right|42||align=right|54||align=right|32
||Third round
|
|-
|2005
|Tippeligaen
|align=right |11
|align=right|26||align=right|8||align=right|7||align=right|11
|align=right|35||align=right|44||align=right|31
||Fourth round
|
|-
|2006
|Tippeligaen
|align=right |8
|align=right|26||align=right|8||align=right|8||align=right|10
|align=right|38||align=right|46||align=right|32
|bgcolor=gold|Winner
|
|-
|2007
|Tippeligaen
|align=right |8
|align=right|26||align=right|9||align=right|9||align=right|9
|align=right|37||align=right|40||align=right|36
||Third round
|
|-
|2008
|Tippeligaen
|  style="text-align:right; background:silver;"|2
|align=right|26||align=right|14||align=right|6||align=right|6
|align=right|38||align=right|28||align=right|48
||Quarterfinal
|
|-
|2009
|Tippeligaen
|align=right bgcolor="#FFCCCC"| 14
|align=right|30||align=right|10||align=right|4||align=right|16
|align=right|39||align=right|44||align=right|34
||Fourth round
|Relegated to the 1. divisjon
|-
|2010 
|1. divisjon
|align=right bgcolor=#DDFFDD| 3
|align=right|28||align=right|14||align=right|8||align=right|6
|align=right|53||align=right|37||align=right|50
||Fourth round
|Promoted to the Tippeligaen through playoffs
|-
|2011
|Tippeligaen 
|align=right |12
|align=right|30||align=right|10||align=right|6||align=right|14
|align=right|38||align=right|41||align=right|36
||Semifinal
|
|-
|2012 
|Tippeligaen 
|align=right bgcolor="#FFCCCC"| 15
|align=right|30||align=right|9||align=right|3||align=right|18
|align=right|42||align=right|59||align=right|30
||Second round
|Relegated to the 1. divisjon
|-
|2013 
|1. divisjon
|align=right |10
|align=right|30||align=right|11||align=right|8||align=right|11
|align=right|44||align=right|41||align=right|41
||Third round
|
|-
|2014 
|1. divisjon
|align=right |6
|align=right|30||align=right|14||align=right|6||align=right|10
|align=right|35||align=right|26||align=right|48
||Second round
|
|-
|2015 
|1. divisjon
|align=right |12
|align=right|30||align=right|8||align=right|11||align=right|11
|align=right|41||align=right|61||align=right|35
||Second round
|Escaped relegation in the 6th minute of added time
|-
|2016
|1. divisjon
|align=right |11
|align=right|30||align=right|8||align=right|9||align=right|13
|align=right|34||align=right|48||align=right|33
||Third round
|
|-
|2017 
|1. divisjon
|align=right bgcolor="#FFCCCC"| 14
|align=right|30||align=right|5||align=right|11||align=right|14
|align=right|33||align=right|51||align=right|26
||First round
|Relegated to 2. divisjon
|-
|2018 
|2. divisjon
|align=right |2
|align=right|26||align=right|15||align=right|7||align=right|4
|align=right|53||align=right|25||align=right|52
||Second round
|
|-
|2019
|2. divisjon
|align=right |3
|align=right|26||align=right|16||align=right|5||align=right|5
|align=right|52||align=right|28||align=right|53
||Second round
|
|-
|2020  
|2. divisjon
|align=right bgcolor=#DDFFDD| 1
|align=right|19||align=right|17||align=right|1||align=right|1
|align=right|60||align=right|19||align=right|52
||Cancelled 
|Promoted to 1. divisjon
|-
|2021  
|1. divisjon
|align=right |4
|align=right|30||align=right|15||align=right|7||align=right|8
|align=right|60||align=right|42||align=right|52
||Second round
|
|-
|2022
|1. divisjon
|align=right |10
|align=right|30||align=right|9||align=right|8||align=right|13
|align=right|46||align=right|51||align=right|35
||Third round
|
|}
Source:

Players

First team squad

Dagfinn Enerly's jersey number 8 is retired.

Retired numbers
8 –  Dagfinn Enerly, Winger (2004–05)

Coaching staff

Coaches
 Knut Torbjørn Eggen (2002–04)
 Egil Olsen (2005)
 Knut Torbjørn Eggen (2006)
 Anders Grönhagen (2007–09)
 Tom Nordlie (2009–10)
 Tom Freddy Aune (2010–12)
 Trond Amundsen (2012)
 Lars Bakkerud (2013)
 Håkon Wibe-Lund (2013–2015)
 Jan Tore Ophaug & Aleksander Olsen (interim) (2015)
 Arne Erlandsen (2015)
 Jan Halvor Halvorsen (2015–2016)
 Mons Ivar Mjelde (2016) 
 Andrea Loberto (2016–2017)
 Per-Mathias Høgmo (2017–2018)
 Bjørn Johansen (2019–)

European record

References

Bibliography

External links 

 Plankehaugen – Official Supporter Club
 FFKSupporter.net – Unofficial supporter homepage

 
Eliteserien clubs
Sport in Fredrikstad
Companies based in Fredrikstad
Association football clubs established in 1903
Bandy clubs established in 1903
1903 establishments in Norway